Parineeti Chopra (born 22 October 1988) is an Indian actress who primarily works in Hindi films. Chopra is a recipient of several accolades, including a Filmfare and a National Film Award. She has appeared in Forbes India Celebrity 100 list since 2013.

After obtaining a triple honours degree in business, finance and economics from Manchester Business School, Chopra returned to India during the 2009 economic recession and joined Yash Raj Films as a public relations consultant. Later, she signed a deal with the company as an actress. She made her acting debut with the 2011 romantic comedy Ladies vs Ricky Bahl, winning the Filmfare Award for Best Female Debut. She followed it by garnering acclaim for her starring roles in the box office hits— Ishaqzaade (2012), Shuddh Desi Romance (2013) and Hasee Toh Phasee (2014). The first of these won her the National Film Award – Special Mention while the former two earned her nominations for the Filmfare Award for Best Actress. 

This success was followed by several poorly received films and a three-year hiatus. Her only successful films during this period were the horror-comedy Golmaal Again (2017) and the war drama Kesari (2019), in which she had a brief role. In 2021, Chopra earned critical praise for her leading roles in the black comedy Sandeep Aur Pinky Faraar and the sports biopic Saina. She received another Filmfare nomination for Best Actress for the former. She has since played a supporting role in Uunchai (2022).

In addition to her acting career, Chopra is a prominent celebrity endorser for brands and products. She has sung some of her film songs, including "Maana Ke Hum Yaar Nahin" and "Teri Mitti". In 2022, Chopra ventured into television by judging the reality show Hunarbaaz: Desh Ki Shaan on Colors TV.

Early life and work 
Chopra was born on 22 October 1988 in Ambala, Haryana into a Punjabi Hindu family. Her father, Pawan Chopra, is a businessman and supplier to the Indian Army at Ambala Cantonment and her mother is Reena Chopra. She has two brothers: Shivang and Sahaj; actresses Priyanka Chopra, Meera Chopra and Mannara Chopra are her cousins. Chopra studied at the Convent of Jesus and Mary, Ambala. In an interview published in The Hindu, she revealed that she was a very good student and had always wanted to become an investment banker.

At the age of 17, Chopra moved to England, where she received a triple honours degree in business, finance and economics from Manchester Business School.  She used to take orientation classes for new students at the university. While studying, she worked part-time for the Manchester United Football Club as the team leader of the catering department. Chopra is also a trained Hindustani classical singer with a B.A. Honours in music. She used to perform on stage with her cousin, Priyanka, and their fathers in her childhood.

In 2009, she returned to India in the wake of the economic recession and moved to Mumbai. Chopra obtained an internship in the marketing department of Yash Raj Films, joining the production company as a public-relations consultant. She considered it a perfect job, because she could use what she had learned and work in films. While working on promotions for Band Baaja Baaraat (2010), Chopra realized that she wanted to become an actress and decided to resign from her executive position with Yash Raj Films to attend acting school. After meeting the company's casting director, she was asked to do a "dummy audition for fun". Chopra remembered "fooling around with a camera" and delivering lines by the character Geet from the film Jab We Met (2007). When YRF producer Aditya Chopra saw the tape he was impressed with her acting. Chopra was then signed to a 3-film deal.

Acting career

Debut, breakthrough and accolades (2011–2014) 

In 2011, Chopra made her screen debut in a supporting role in the romantic comedy Ladies vs Ricky Bahl with Ranveer Singh and Anushka Sharma in lead roles. The film describes how three girls who are tricked by a con artist take revenge on him by plotting the same trick for him. Chopra played the Delhi-based "rich and spoiled brat" Dimple Chadda, who is betrayed by the film's central character. The film received mixed reviews from critics, and was moderately successful at the box office. Chopra's performance received high praise from critics. Komal Nahta said, "Of the three other girls, Chopra is undoubtedly the best. She has the best role, the best lines and hers is the best performance among the three." Priyanka Roy of The Telegraph described Chopra as "natural" and wrote "Among the ladies, debutante Chopra almost steals the show from Sharma." The film earned her several awards, including the Filmfare Award, the Screen Award, the Producers Guild Film Award and the IIFA Award for Best Debut. Chopra also received nominations in the supporting actress category, including Filmfare, and won the Producers Guild and IIFA Awards in the same category.

Chopra's second release was Habib Faisal's action romantic drama Ishaqzaade in which she played a leading role opposite Arjun Kapoor. The film revolves around two political families, whose rivalry (and mutual hatred) go back generations. Chopra played the boisterous and feisty tomboy Zoya, a Muslim girl who marries a Hindu boy and gives birth to new rivalry in both families. The film received positive reviews from critics, with Chopra's performance receiving widespread praise. Taran Adarsh observed, "Chopra is simply fantastic [...] Playing the part of a spirited gun-toting girl, she is not the regular timid, decorous, withdrawn Hindi film heroine. She portrays the violent behavior coupled with the audacious and brash attitude with aplomb", and Rajeev Masand labelled her the "biggest strength of the film". Chopra earned a National Film Award – Special Mention at the 60th National Film Awards, and received first nominations for the Producers Guild, Screen and Filmfare Award for Best Actress.

Chopra next appeared alongside Sushant Singh Rajput and Vaani Kapoor in the romantic comedy-drama Shuddh Desi Romance (2013), her second collaboration with Maneesh Sharma. The film, set in Jaipur, received positive reviews from critics and Chopra's portrayal of Gayatri, an outspoken and rebellious girl, received particular praise. CNN-IBN noted that the film belonged to Chopra, who "turns Gayatri into the most real woman one have encountered on screen", and the critic Mayank Shekhar added "Chopra's act in the film's first half is nothing short of National Award-winning material." Shuddh Desi Romance collected  at the domestic box-office and emerged as a commercial success. Chopra garnered several Best Actress nominations, including her second Filmfare nomination for Best Actress.

Chopra's first of three releases of 2014 was Dharma Productions' romantic comedy-drama Hasee Toh Phasee, her first role outside the Yash Raj Films banner. She portrayed Dr. Meeta Solanki, a mad scientist on the run, opposite Sidharth Malhotra. Directed by Vinil Matthew and jointly produced by Anurag Kashyap and Karan Johar, the film emerged a commercial success at the box office, and received positive reviews from critics, with Chopra's portrayal receiving widespread praise. Saibal Chatterjee of NDTV wrote that Chopra was "pitch-perfect with her goofball act" and Hindustan Times published that she re-defined the concept of a Bollywood heroine with the film. She received BIG Star Entertainment Awards Most Entertaining Actor in a Comedy Film for her performance in the film.

Habib Faisal's dowry-based social comedy film Daawat-e-Ishq marked Chopra's second collaboration with Faisal. She was cast as Gulrez "Gullu" Qadir, a middle-class salesgirl from Hyderabad alongside Aditya Roy Kapur and Anupam Kher. The film received mixed reviews though Chopra was praised. Film critic Sarita A. Tanwar from Daily News Analysis found Chopra to be "the best thing about the film" and added, "Chopra shines in every scene. She does what she does every single time — rises head and shoulders above the film and her costars." Chopra next played her first "glamorous role" in Shaad Ali's crime film Kill Dil, co-starring Govinda, Ranveer Singh and Ali Zafar. Sukanya Verma of Rediff.com found the film to be a "disaster" and wrote that "Chopra is terribly miscast and wears clothes that should have never left the wardrobe". Both Daawat-e-Ishq and Kill Dil were unsuccessful at the box office. In 2014, she also appeared in the short film, Dor as Ria.

Hiatus and career fluctuations (2015–2020) 

Chopra had 3-year sabbatical from full-time acting, during which she portrayed Muskaan Raza Qureshi in Dishoom, appearing in the song "Jaaneman Aah". Chopra returned to the screen in 2017 with Yash Raj Films' romantic drama Meri Pyaari Bindu opposite Ayushmann Khurrana. The film tells the story about a writer who uses his heartbreak as fuel for his next book and Chopra played the titular character, Bindu Shankarnarayanan, an aspiring singer, whose story is told from the writer's perspective. Anisha Jhaveri of IndieWire praised Chopra for "grounding Bindu with flickers of genuine sensitivity and vulnerability [...] hinting that there’s more to the character behind that flighty surface." Rajeev Masand called her performance as "sincere", but felt that the actress was given very less to work it thanks to the "flighty and fickle" nature of her character. She next starred opposite Ajay Devgn in Rohit Shetty's comedy Golmaal Again, the fourth installment in the Golmaal film series. Bollywood Hungama noted, "Chopra has a crucial character and from the first sequence itself, there’s an element of mystery surrounding her character that adds to the fun. She looks beautiful and does a good job." The film broke several box office records and was eventually declared a blockbuster, thus becoming her highest-grossing film to date.

Chopra's only release of 2018 was Vipul Amrutlal Shah's romantic comedy Namaste England, alongside Arjun Kapoor, a sequel to Shah's Namastey London (2007) starring Akshay Kumar and Katrina Kaif. The film marked Chopra's second collaboration with Kapoor after Ishaqzaade. The film was a critical and commercial failure. Shilpa Jamkhandikar of Reuters felt the actress was "sleepwalking through a role that didn’t have too much meat in the first place" and Nandini Ramnath of Scroll noted that Chopra's usual spikiness was missing.

The first film appearance of Chopra's of 2019 was in a brief role opposite Kumar in the historical war film Kesari directed by Anurag Singh. It told the story of the events leading up to the Battle of Saragarhi, a battle between 21 soldiers of the 36th Sikhs of the British Indian Army and 10,000 Afridi and Orakzai Pashtun tribesmen in 1897. Chopra played the role of Jeevani Kaur, the wife of Ishar Singh, the leader of the Sikh soldiers, appearing in his imaginary conversations before and after the battle. Sukanya Verma of Rediff.com felt that Chopra had "precious little to do" in the film. However, Rachit Gupta of The Times of India noted her "small, but impactful role", writing "it’s her character’s fun banter with Kumar that puts a smile on your face and her tears break your heart."

Her second release of the year was Jabariya Jodi with Sidharth Malhotra, an action romantic comedy, based upon the tradition of groom kidnapping, prevalent in Bihar. The film received unanimously negative reviews and was a box office flop. Writing for NDTV, film critic Saibal Chatterjee felt that Chopra "punctuates her perky, no-nonsense girl persona with moments of demure docility" but "all the effort that she makes to traverse the gamut quickly ceases to convey any meaning in the absence of cohesion and clarity in the character's motives." Shubhra Gupta of The Indian Express wrote that "Chopra, togged out in the most outlandish clothes Patna may have been witness too, seems to have got stuck in a rut of familiarity."

Renewed critical recognition (2021–present) 
Her first on-screen appearance of 2021 was The Girl on the Train, a Hindi remake of British film of same name based on the novel of the same name by British author Paula Hawkins, was released on Netflix. The film was directed by Ribhu Dasgupta featuring Chopra as an alcoholic and troubled divorcee who gets embroiled in a murder investigation. It also featured Avinash Tiwary, Aditi Rao Hydari and Kirti Kulhari. In a negative review for Firstpost, the film was criticised for "lacklustre writing" but her performance was praised as "sincere", writing "She manages to embed herself in Mira’s tortured mind, giving this film its one selling point." Chopra next starred opposite Arjun Kapoor in Dibakar Banerjee's black comedy Sandeep Aur Pinky Faraar. Filmfare felt that the screen belonged to Chopra, writing "She’s the epicenter of the drama and has a multi-layered character that she plays around with. She swiftly moves from a strong unbreakable woman to a broken and vulnerable victim." Times of India wrote, "Performance wise, it’s a Parineeti show all the way. She gets an ample scope to live Sandy’s multi-layered character, who is strong yet vulnerable and insecure. Parineeti gives it all to make Sandy’s intricate and hard-to-read persona likeable and her performance is one of the few factors that hold the film’s uneven narrative together." She received another Best Actress nomination at Filmfare. 

The biographical sports drama Saina was Chopra's final film of the year. Directed by Amol Gupte, the film saw her portraying the badminton player Saina Nehwal. Her performance received critical acclaim. Shubhra Gupta of The Indian Express noted that she serves drops and smashes as the badminton champ", writing Chopra gives us a good, solid Saina Nehwal. When she raises her racket after a hard-fought win, you cheer."

Ribhu Dasgupta's espionage thriller Code Name: Tiranga became Chopra's first film of 2022. It received negative reviews and emerged as a commercial failure. Deepa Gahlot of Rediff.com wrote that Chopra "gets her fair share of the footage, but seems to equate scowling and squinting with seriousness of purpose." In her final film of the year, Chopra featured as Shraddha Gupta, a tour guide, in the ensemble film Uunchai, directed by Sooraj Barjatya under Rajshri Productions. Anuj Kumar of The Hindu opined that she "gets a half-baked character, and yet, she makes the most of it".

Chopra will next appear in the thriller Capsule Gill opposite Akshay Kumar. She has also committed to star in Imtiaz Ali's Chamkila opposite Diljit Dosanjh.

Other ventures 
In 2014, Chopra made her first appearance on television in Zee TV's India's Best Cinestars Ki Khoj as a mentor. In 2015, she first did a cameo role of a doctor in the mini web-series Man's World. She then appeared as Mariama in the documentary Girl Rising India – Woh Padhegi, Woh Udegi, that premiered on Star Plus on the occasion of Raksha Bandhan. In addition to this, she has hosted the 3rd Stardust Awards with Ayushmann Khurana in 2013, the 11th Star Guild Awards with Kapil Sharma in 2015 and the second Times of India Film Awards with Riteish Deshmukh in 2016. She next appeared as a contestant on Star Plus's Lip Sing Battle along with Karan Johar in 2017. In 2018, she hosted the 63rd Filmfare Awards with Shah Rukh Khan, Johar and Khurana. Chopra made her television debut as a judge alongside Mithun Chakraborty and Johar on the reality show titled Hunarbaaz: Desh Ki Shaan, which premiered on Colors TV in 2022. She also appeared as a guest and contestant on Khatra Khatra Khatra, the same year.

Chopra made her playback singing debut in 2017 with the song "Maana Ke Hum Yaar Nahin" and received praise for her vocal performance and singing. Bollywood Hungama praised Chopra and wrote, "One has to admit that she does a really good job in rendering this one. The kind of 'thehrav' that she brings with her singing is truly remarkable." She received Screen Award for Best Female Playback and Mirchi Music Award for Upcoming Female Vocalist of The Year nominations. In 2019, Chopra recorded the female version of the song "Teri Mitti" for the film, Kesari, when the film entered "Rs 150 cr club". She sang the unplugged version of the song "Matlabi Yariyan" for the film The Girl on the Train in 2021.

In August 2016, Chopra performed in various cities in the United States  for the "Dream Team 2016" tour, alongside Johar, Varun Dhawan, Sidharth Malhotra, Aditya Roy Kapur, Katrina Kaif, Alia Bhatt and Badshah. According to Chopra, she felt "rejuvenated" post the Dream Team tour.

Off-screen work 
In addition to acting in films, Chopra is active in charity work and supports a number of causes. She walked the ramp at the Wills Lifestyle India Fashion Week to support the Shabana Azmi Mijwan Welfare Society, a NGO dedicated to empowering girls. She also appeared on NDTV's Greenathon, an initiative to support eco-friendliness and investigate poor electricity supplies in rural villages, to lend her support.  Chopra was appointed as the brand ambassador for the 'Beti Bachao-Beti Padhao' campaign to promote the cause of girl child by the Haryana government in 2015. In 2016, she was seen on the TV show Mission Sapne, where she helped 13-year-old Bhavna Suthalya secure a better future.

In 2017, Chopra became an ambassador for Tourism Australia in ‘Friends of Australia’ advocacy panel by Tourism Australia. According to the India Entertainment Marketing Report 2019, Indian visitors to Australia have grown at an average of 21 percent since the appointment of Chopra in comparison to 15 percent growth experienced during the prior six months. In 2020, Chopra did a virtual coffee date with people to raise funds that will feed 4,000 family members of 1,000 daily wage earners.

Chopra is an aquaphile and was chosen as PADI's AmbassaDiver in May 2022. She has taken active part in cleaning the ocean during her scuba diving sessions. Chopra also cleaned Mumbai's beach post Ganpati visarjan in September 2022. She has also ramp walked in the Lakme Fashion Week and has been the cover model for several magazines. Chopra was conferred with "Master Scuba Diver" title in 2023.

In 2019, Chopra spoke about her personal experience of battling depression. 
Chopra has been outspoken on issues such as weight gain and body-shaming. She said, "Body-shaming is the most ridiculous thing on earth. It is something natural and what you are born with. But every human being should strive to be their fittest. They shouldn’t strive to be the skinniest. You can be fit at your body type." On being criticised for her weight, she said, "I agreed with them that I wasn’t looking my best. I wasn’t doing my best for my fitness. I think I would have gotten hurt if I was doing everything that I could and I was really my fittest, and then people didn’t like the way I looked. I think that would have affected me. But I agreed with them because I knew I wasn’t doing my best."

Chopra also spoke on pay gap in Bollywood. She said, "I always felt like I deserved a little bit more but I only got this much. But then girls do a lot of endorsements so we kind of make it up. So that is why I never talk about it (pay parity) because the boys don’t do as many endorsements as girls. I hope I’m right. We do so many beauty commercials and hair commercials like so many brands and I think we kind of cover it up." She received severe criticism for her statement.

Artistry and screen persona  

Following her debut, Chopra was regarded as one of the most promising actresses in Hindi cinema. For her portrayal of brash, loud mouthed Dimple Chaddha in Ladies vs Ricky Bahl, Rajeev Masand said that "she steals the film from under the nose of its leads". She was termed as Bollywood's "Girl Next Door". She is noted for her acting versatility. 

The actress' roles and performances have been studied by critics. NDTV noted, "[Chopra]....is as far removed from the standard Bollywood bombshell as it is possible for a lead actress to be. She's more girl next door than glamour doll, with no obvious oomph in evidence, and freely confesses to a battle with the weighing scale". The Indian Express labelled her the "most brightest and talented" newcomer of this generation, noting "her infectious amount of energy". While discussing her career in a 2013 article, CNN-IBN noted, "[she]....is one of the few actresses in the current lot who has a strong screen presence which demands absolute attention from the viewer. When she is on screen, one can't notice other actors—Parineeti engages you in such a way". Filmfare noted, "She’s not only an actress with great screen presence, but also a loveable personality off screen....quite the complete package".

Writer Suhani Singh find Chopra to be animated, charming and fun woman who dreads the word "workout". She says Chopra has an "attractive and vivacious personality". Verves Sitanshi Talati-Parikh termed her "gritty and hard-working to the extent of being tenacious" about her roles, her characters, her life. For her performance in Ishaqzaade, film critic Rajeev Masand described her as "the biggest strength of the film". But with her earlier repititive roles he thought her "sheen was wearing off". Amit Tyagi of India Today feels Chopra has been "working towards changing woman characters' portrayal in Bollywood" with one film at a time. While writing for Vogue, Anil Thakraney termed Chopra's "punctuality and respect for another person's time" as a rarity in the film world. Shrishti Negi of News 18 finds her to be the performer who has "always been good, always been multifaceted".

Her directors believes Chopra gets into the skin of her characters. Vinil Mathew had said, "Parineeti is a clown and I wanted a character like her in my film. She is an extremely quirky actress" he further added that Chopra was always on his "wish list". Dibakar Banerjee found Chopra to be a "very strong willed and combative individual who needs her own answers". He further said, "Parineeti taught me a lesson about ‘gameface’ I'll never forget it and I used it in the film."

Chopra says, "I never think, speak or act diplomatically." She further says she stays "focused on her character or a scene and enjoy being this new person". In a interview with Hindustan Times, Chopra revealed that she intends to do films where she has lot to perform, and not the films which has high production value. She said,

Public image 
Chopra has appeared in Forbes India Celebrity 100 list since 2013.

The actress appeared on Verves list of most powerful women in 2011. She ranked 2nd in Times of Indias Most Promising Newcomer of 2011. In its 50 Most Desirable Women List, she ranked 44th in 2013. In 2012 and 2014, Rediff.com placed her in their listing of the top 10 Bollywood actresses. She was placed in The Indian Expresss Top 10 Bollywood Actresses of 2013 List. Chopra also appeared on the most searched celebrities list of 2014. In Eastern Eyes 50 Sexiest Asian Women List, she ranked 14th in 2013 and 33rd in 2015.

Apart from charity work, she serves as an ambassador for a number of brands. Chopra endorses brands such as Kurkure, Nivea, Maaza and Spinz, WeChat, Pantene, Vadilal and Mahindra scooty. She became the first Bollywood star to endorse products from both Coke (Maaza) and PepsiCo (Kurkure) at the same time. Chopra is also the brand ambassador of ADEX India and Jovees Herbal.

Chopra has been known for her unfiltered opinions. When Alia Bhatt was asked whom she would like to gift the book, ‘Style for Dummies’.: “I don’t want to offend anyone but, because I think Parineeti is such a good actor, (but) I think she can do much better in that zone. She has a very pretty face,” she says. Parineeti, instead of hitting back, actually took the suggestion in good humour. She said, “So true, I need them (styling tips). I’m learning and getting better, though.” Over the years, Chopra has impressed fashion critics with her impeccable sense of style. 

For her role in Code Name: Tiranga, she learnt Krav Maga, an Israeli martial art developed for the Israel Defense Forces. Chopra received India UK Achievers Honours as Outstanding Achiever in "Arts, Entertainment, Culture" category in 2023. She is also one of the most followed celebrities on social media with over 39.9 million Instagram and 14.6 million Twitter followers.

Filmography

Films

Television

Documentary

Discography

Accolades 

Chopra is a recipient of a National Film Award – Special Mention for Ishaqzaade (2012) and a Filmfare Best Female Debut for Ladies vs Ricky Bahl (2011). Additionally, she has been nominated for four more Filmfare Awards: Best Supporting Actress for Ladies vs Ricky Bahl (2011) and Best Actress for Ishaqzaade (2012), Shuddh Desi Romance (2013) and Sandeep Aur Pinky Faraar.

Notes

References

External links 

 
 
 

Punjabi Hindus
1988 births
21st-century Indian actresses
Alumni of the University of Manchester
Actresses in Hindi cinema
Indian film actresses
Living people
People from Ambala
Actresses from Haryana
Alumni of the Manchester Business School
Special Mention (feature film) National Film Award winners
Filmfare Awards winners
Screen Awards winners
Zee Cine Awards winners
International Indian Film Academy Awards winners